Fernando Hernández (born July 31, 1984) is an American former professional baseball pitcher.

Career
Hernández was drafted by the Chicago White Sox in the 49th round of the 2002 Major League Baseball Draft. He was later taken in the Rule V Draft by the Oakland Athletics before the  season. Hernández made the opening day roster with a spot in the bullpen. On April 9, 2008, Hernández made his major league debut against the Toronto Blue Jays and pitched one inning and struck out one, while receiving a win in the process. On April 14, he was designated for assignment, and on April 16, he was returned to the White Sox. Hernández signed with the Athletics for the 2010 season.

On February 16, 2011, Hernández signed a minor league deal with the New York Yankees. He was released on July 4. He signed a minor league contract with the Toronto Blue Jays on February 28, 2012 for the 2012 season. On May 21, 2013, the Blue Jays activated Hernández from the New Hampshire Fisher Cats disabled list, and released him. Hernandez played for the Laredo Lemurs of the American Association of Independent Professional Baseball for the 2013 season. Hernandez signed with the Long Island Ducks for the 2014 season. Hernandez signed with the Kansas City T-Bones of the American Association of Independent Professional Baseball for the 2015 season.

References

External links

1984 births
Living people
American expatriate baseball players in Mexico
Baseball players from Miami
Birmingham Barons players
Broward Seahawks baseball players
Camden Riversharks players
Charlotte Knights players
Criollos de Caguas players
Great Falls White Sox players
Kannapolis Intimidators players
Kansas City T-Bones players
Laredo Lemurs players
Liga de Béisbol Profesional Roberto Clemente pitchers
Long Island Ducks players
Major League Baseball pitchers
Mexican League baseball pitchers
New Hampshire Fisher Cats players
Oakland Athletics players
Petroleros de Minatitlán players
Phoenix Desert Dogs players
Sacramento River Cats players
Scranton/Wilkes-Barre Yankees players
Somerset Patriots players
Tiburones de La Guaira players
American expatriate baseball players in Venezuela
Trenton Thunder players
Winston-Salem Warthogs players
Southwest Miami Senior High School alumni